Jamie Robert Day (born 7 May 1986) is an English former footballer who last played as a defender for Crawley Town in League Two.

Career
Born in Falmouth, Cornwall, Day started his career at Peterborough United and made more than 100 appearances for the London Road club. Between September and October 2004 he was on loan to Crawley Town and had a spell at Dagenham & Redbridge in 2009. In June 2010 he signed for Rushden & Diamonds in the Conference National. After an impressive season for Rushden & Diamonds, Day joined Football League new boys Crawley Town on 27 May 2011 on a free transfer.
In November 2011, Day was loaned out to Aldershot Town until January 2012, but failed to make an appearance for the club.

On 8 August 2012, Day announced his immediate retirement from football due to an ongoing back problem.

Honours

Promotions
2008–09: League One Runner Up (promotion to The Championship) – Peterborough United
2007–08: League Two Runner Up (promotion to League One) – Peterborough United

References

External links

Profile at UpThePosh! The Peterborough United Database

1986 births
People from Falmouth, Cornwall
Living people
Association football defenders
English footballers
Peterborough United F.C. players
Crawley Town F.C. players
Dagenham & Redbridge F.C. players
Rushden & Diamonds F.C. players
Aldershot Town F.C. players
English Football League players
National League (English football) players